Rock Rabbit Lakes are two small freshwater lakes located within the Alpine Lakes Wilderness in a valley on the northern slope of Keechelus Ridge between Keechelus Lake and Kachess Lake in Kittitas County, Washington, United States. Because of its close proximity to Rampart Ridge, Interstate 90 and several cirque on both sides of Keechelus Ridge, the lake is a common area for hiking, swimming, and fishing rainbow trout. Keechelus Ridge is accessed through trail 4934 which covers the length of the ridge. A short distance north is Swan Lake, Stonethrow Lake, and Margaret Lake.

See also 
 List of lakes of the Alpine Lakes Wilderness

External links 
 Swan / Rock Rabbit / Stonestrow Lakes Illustration of roads and trails to Rock Rabbit Lakes and surroundings on Washington Trails Association site.

References 

Lakes of Kittitas County, Washington
Lakes of the Alpine Lakes Wilderness
Okanogan National Forest